Duncan Barkes is a radio presenter who has worked for a number of British talk radio stations including LBC, talkSPORT, BBC Radio Five Live and BBC Radio London. His shows were usually late night or overnight phone-in programmes. Barkes has also written for various national and regional newspapers. In February 2021 he announced he was leaving the BBC to work as a political adviser for a Conservative Party MP. He currently combines presenting the occasional radio show on various different radio stations whilst working in public affairs in Sussex.

Writing career
He has written columns for many newspapers including the Daily Express, where he wrote articles on a number of political and social issues. He has also written a syndicated newspaper column. It started off as the "Barkes At Large" column and it ran for seven years in various newspapers across West Sussex. The column tackled a wide range of issue and often sparked controversy. Barkes has also written his own book titled The Dumbing Down Of Britain. He is a member of the Chartered Institute of Journalists.

Broadcasting career
His broadcasting career spans over 25 years and includes regional and commercial stations such as Spirit FM, Jazz FM, BBC Southern Counties Radio, Radio City, Radio City Talk, Talksport, and LBC. Barkes did not renew his contract with LBC; he instead decided to join BBC Radio London on 5 July 2015 to present "London's Late Night Radio Phone-in". In 2015, Barkes was nominated in the ‘Radio Programme of the Year’ category as part of the Broadcasting Press Guild Awards facing competition from BBC Radio 4 and BBC Five Live. During his time at Radio London he achieved record high audience figures in the late night slot.

Campaigning career
Barkes has a long history working as a campaigner and media consultant managing various press offices and PR departments. He has also campaigned on numerous issues that range from social campaigns protecting local health services to national campaigns conceived to raising awareness issues. During his time campaigning he has worked alongside several politicians, these include Ken Livingstone and UKIP leader Nigel Farage. Barkes has also worked with Nigel Farage on the run-up to the 2010 General elections. He also acted as a spokesperson for Farage after he was involved in a near fatal plane crash of which he freed and dragged Farage from the wreckage. Other media work that Duncan Barkes has undertaken whilst working as a media consultant and campaigner, has included placing clients on a variety of news programmes including Question Time. He's also worked with a number of campaigning groups to offer strategic media advice. He has never been a member of any political party despite his past work as a political media consultant.

References

External links
 Dumbing Down Britain on Amazon.com
 BPG Radio Nomination

Living people
Year of birth missing (living people)
Place of birth missing (living people)
British radio presenters
British publishers (people)